Ratimir was a duke or prince (knez) of the Slavs in Lower Pannonia between ca. 829 to 838. It is believed that Ratimir descends from a royal dynasty that provided rulers for Moravia and Croatia.

In 827, the Bulgars under Great Khan Omurtag invaded and conquered Lower Pannonia and parts of Frankish territories to the north. In 829 the Bulgars imposed a local prince, Ratimir, as the new ruler of the territory. His province is believed to have been the territory of the former Roman Pannonia Savia, which is located in modern-day Croatia. Earlier, Sigismund Calles (1750) called him "Slavic duke of the Drava".

In 838, nine years later, following the Bulgarian conquest of Macedonia, the Danubian count Radbod, prefect of the East March, deposed Ratimir and restored Frankish rule. Ratimir fled the land, and the Franks instated dukes Pribina and Kocelj to rule Pannonian area in the name of the Franks.

Unlike his predecessors, Ratimir experienced a rift in relations with the Christian Byzantine Empire.

According to the South Slavic Chronicle of the Priest of Duklja, rejected by historians, one of Ratimir's descendants was Svatopluk.

Annotations

References

Sources

 Annales regni Francorum inde ab a. 741 usque ad a. 829, qui dicuntur Annales Laurissenses maiores et Einhardi. Herausgegeben von Friedrich Kurze. XX und 204 S. 8°. 1895. Printed in 1950.
 Rudolf Horvat, History of Croatia I. (from ancient times to year 1657), Zagreb, 1924. (hr.)
 Nada Klaić, History of Croats in Early Middle Ages, Zagreb, 1975. (hr.)

External links
Annales regni francorum - original text in latin
 "Duke Ratimir", chapter of "Povijest Hrvatske" by Rudolf Horvat, in Croatian Wikisource

Dukes of Croatia
838 deaths
9th century in Croatia
History of Slavonia
9th-century Slavs
9th-century Bulgarian people
Year of birth unknown
9th-century people from East Francia
Slavic warriors